Mary Agnes Canty (22 March 1879 – 6 October 1950) was a New Zealand catholic nun, teacher and nursing school matron. She was born in Greta, New South Wales, Australia on 22 March 1879.

References

1879 births
1950 deaths
New Zealand educators
Australian emigrants to New Zealand
New Zealand nurses
20th-century New Zealand Roman Catholic nuns
New Zealand women nurses